The 1971–72 QMJHL season was the third season in the history of the Quebec Major Junior Hockey League. Ten teams played 62 games each in the schedule. The Cornwall Royals finished first place in the regular season, and won the President's Cup, defeating the Quebec Remparts in the finals. The Royals won the 1972 Memorial Cup, representing the QMJHL at the first Memorial Cup round-robin tournament.

Team changes
 The Rosemont National relocate to Laval, Quebec, becoming the Laval National.

Final standings
Note: GP = Games played; W = Wins; L = Losses; T = Ties; Pts = Points; GF = Goals for; GA = Goals against

complete list of standings.

Scoring leaders
Note: GP = Games played; G = Goals; A = Assists; Pts = Points; PIM = Penalties in minutes

 complete scoring statistics

Playoffs
Jacques Richard was the leading scorer of the playoffs with 37 points (11 goals, 26 assists).

Quarterfinals
 Cornwall Royals defeated Verdun Maple Leafs 4 games to 0.
 Drummondville Rangers defeated Trois-Rivières Ducs 4 games to 1.
 Quebec Remparts defeated Sherbrooke Castors 4 games to 0.
 Shawinigan Bruins defeated Sorel Éperviers 4 games to 0.

Semifinals
 Cornwall Royals defeated Shawinigan Bruins 4 games to 1.
 Quebec Remparts defeated Drummondville Rangers 4 games to 0.

Finals
 Cornwall Royals defeated Quebec Remparts 4 games to 2, 1 tie.

All-star teams
First team
 Goaltender - Richard Brodeur, Cornwall Royals
 Left defence - Guy Provost, Drummondville Rangers
 Right defence - Richard Campeau, Sorel Éperviers
 Left winger - Claude St. Sauveur, Sherbrooke Castors
 Centreman - Jacques Richard, Quebec Remparts
 Right winger - Rejean Giroux, Quebec Remparts
 Coach - Orval Tessier, Cornwall Royals
Second team 
 Goaltender - Denis Herron, Trois-Rivières Ducs 
 Left defence - Denis Deslauriers, Shawinigan Bruins
 Right defence - Jean Hamel, Drummondville Rangers 
 Left winger - Noel Desfosses, Sorel Éperviers
 Centreman - Gerry Teeple, Cornwall Royals
 Right winger - Maurice Desfosses, St-Jérôme Alouettes
 Coach - Ghislain Delage, Sorel Éperviers
 List of First/Second/Rookie team all-stars.

Trophies and awards
Team
President's Cup - Playoff Champions, Cornwall Royals
Jean Rougeau Trophy - Regular Season Champions, Cornwall Royals

Player
Jean Béliveau Trophy - Top Scorer, Jacques Richard, Quebec Remparts
Jacques Plante Memorial Trophy - Best GAA, Richard Brodeur, Cornwall Royals
Michel Bergeron Trophy - Rookie of the Year, Bob Murray, Cornwall Royals
Frank J. Selke Memorial Trophy - Most sportsmanlike player, Gerry Teeple, Cornwall Royals

See also
1972 Memorial Cup
1972 NHL Entry Draft
1971–72 OHA season
1971–72 WCHL season

References
 Official QMJHL Website
 www.hockeydb.com/

Quebec Major Junior Hockey League seasons
QMJHL